The Custos Rotulorum of Londonderry and Down was the highest civil officer in counties Londonderry and Down.

Incumbents

Londonderry
 1663–1665 John Clotworthy, 1st Viscount Massereene
 1666–1695 John Skeffington, 2nd Viscount Massereene (attainted 1689, reappointed 1693, died 1695)

Down
 1660–1663 Hugh Montgomery, 1st Earl of Mount Alexander
 1663–? William Montgomery (died 1706) 
 1678–1683 Michael Hill (died 1693)  (also Custos Rotulorum of Antrim 1678-?)
 1683–? Hugh Montgomery, 2nd Earl of Mount Alexander
 ?1693–?1699 Michael Hill (died 1699)
 1729–1742 Trevor Hill, 1st Viscount Hillsborough (died 1742) 
1742–1793 Wills Hill, 1st Marquess of Downshire
1793–?1801 Arthur Hill, 2nd Marquess of Downshire (died 1801)

Londonderry and Down
 1803–?1821 Robert Stewart, 1st Marquess of Londonderry
 1821–1822 Robert Stewart, Viscount Castlereagh
 1822–?1854 Charles Vane, 3rd Marquess of Londonderry (died 1854) 

For later custodes rotulorum, see Lord Lieutenant of Londonderry and Lord Lieutenant of Down

References

Londonderry